William Anderson Coffin (1855–1925) was an American landscape and figure painter. He also was an art critic, working for the New York Post and Harper's Weekly. In 1917 he would be awarded the French Legion of Honor.

Personal life and education

William Anderson Coffin was born in Allegheny, Pennsylvania, to James Gardiner Coffin and Isabella C. Anderson, on January 31, 1855. He graduated with a degree in fine art from Yale University in 1874. Three years later he would move to Paris, France where he would study under Léon Bonnat. In 1882 he moved to New York City. The Coffin family had a farm in Jennerstown, Pennsylvania, which would appear in many of his landscape paintings. He died on October 26, 1925 in New York City.

Artistic career

While in Paris Coffin would exhibit his work at the Paris Salon in 1879, 1880 and 1882. Upon moving to New York, he would exhibit at the National Academy of Design and write as an art critic for Harper's Weekly, Scribner's Magazine, New York Post, and served as art editor for the New York Sun. In Buffalo, New York he directed the Fine Arts Division for the Pan-American Exposition. Coffin served as a member of the New York Advisory Board for the Panama–Pacific International Exposition in 1915. He served as president of the American Artists' Committee of One Hundred, which established a relief fund for families of French artists that served in World War I. In 1917 he was awarded the French Legion of Honor for his charitable work. He was also a member of the Architectural League of New York, the Lotos Club and the National Academy of Design.

Legacy

In 1970 his papers were donated to the Archives of American Art by Stewart Klonis, who was gifted the papers by Mrs. DeWitt M. Lockman of Manorville, New York.

Notable collections

Kenyon Cox; Smithsonian American Art Museum
Saturday Night in August – Eighth Avenue, ca. 1900; Brooklyn Museum

Gallery

References

External links
William Anderson Coffin exhibition catalogs
Artwork by William Anderson Coffin

1855 births
1925 deaths
People from Pittsburgh
American art critics
American landscape painters
19th-century American painters
American male painters
20th-century American painters
Journalists from Pennsylvania
New York Post people
Yale University alumni
Recipients of the Legion of Honour
19th-century American male artists
20th-century American male artists